USS Mercury (ID-3012) was a United States Navy transport ship during World War I. She was formerly the Norddeutscher Lloyd liner SS Barbarossa built by Blohm & Voss, Hamburg, Germany, in 1897, and operated by the North German Lloyd Line.

At the outset of World War I the ship was interned by the United States and, when that country entered the conflict in 1917, was seized and converted to a troop transport. After decommissioning by the U.S. Navy, the ship was turned over to the Army Transport Service and then to the U.S. Shipping Board. She was sold for scrapping in February 1924.

History

SS Barbarossa 
SS Barbarossa  was built by Blohm & Voss, Hamburg, Germany, in 1896, for the North German Lloyd Line. She operated on both North Atlantic crossings and the Bremerhaven-Australia route.

With the outbreak of World War I, she took refuge in Hoboken, New Jersey, and was interned by the United States. She was seized when the United States entered the war 6 April 1917.

U.S. Navy transport
Damage inflicted by her crew prior to seizure was repaired and she was commissioned on 3 August 1917. Shortly after commissioning she was renamed USS Mercury.

Mercury got underway for her first transatlantic troop-ferrying mission on 4 January 1918. Before the armistice, she had completed seven voyages to France, carrying over 18,000 passengers. After the armistice, she reversed the flow of troops, making eight crossings to return more than 20,000 to the United States.

Postwar service
After completing her last crossing as a U.S. Navy ship on 19 September 1919, she decommissioned and on 27 September 1919 was turned over to the Army Transport Service for use as an Army transport.  The Army in turn transferred her to the U.S. Shipping Board in August 1920. Mercury was chartered by the Baltic SS Corp of America for a proposed service between New York and Danzig, however the service never operated and the ship was returned to the Shipping Board in January 1921, when she was laid up. She was sold for scrapping in February 1924.

References

External links
 Photo gallery at Naval History and Heritage Command
freepage from Rootsweb

Barbarossa-class ocean liners
Passenger ships of the United States
Ships built in Hamburg
Ships of Norddeutscher Lloyd
World War I auxiliary ships of the United States
Transports of the United States Navy
Transport ships of the United States Army
1896 ships